

Filmography

Film

Television

Video games

Stage

Audio dramas

References

Male actor filmographies
British filmographies